Sailing competitions at the 2022 Mediterranean Games were held from 27 June to 3 July 2022 at the Nautical Base Les Andalouses in El Ançor.

Medal summary

Men's events

Women's events

Medal table

References

External links
2022 Mediterranean Games – Sailing
Results book

Sports at the 2022 Mediterranean Games
2022
Mediterranean Games
Sailing competitions in Algeria